Muralikrishna Prasidh Krishna (born 19 February 1996) is an Indian international cricketer who plays for Karnataka in domestic cricket and Rajasthan Royals in the Indian Premier League. He is a right-arm medium fast bowler who regularly bowls at speeds above 145kmph. He made his One Day International debut for the Indian cricket team on 23 March 2021 in their home series against England and picked up 4 wickets in the match, breaking a 24-year-old Indian record for most wickets on ODI debut.

Domestic career
Prasidh first came to the limelight during Bangladesh A's tour of India in 2015, taking 5 for 49 on first-class debut for Karnataka in a tour match against Bangladesh A in the absence of all three frontline Karnataka pace bowlers. He took a wicket off his first ball, dismissing Rony Talukdar, before taking the wickets of Anamul Haque, Soumya Sarkar and Nasir Hossain in his first spell to reduce Bangladesh A to 41/5. Karnataka went on to win the match by 4 wickets.

He made his List A debut for Karnataka in the 2016–17 Vijay Hazare Trophy on 25 February 2017. He made his Twenty20 debut for Karnataka in the 2017–18 Syed Mushtaq Ali Trophy on 21 January 2018.

He was the leading wicket-taker for Karnataka in the 2018–19 Vijay Hazare Trophy, with thirteen dismissals in seven matches.

In August 2018, he was named in India A cricket team for the 2018 A-team Quadrangular Series. In December 2018, he was named in India's team for the 2018 ACC Emerging Teams Asia Cup.

During the 2021-22 Ranji Trophy, Prasidh took his maiden first-class ten-wicket haul against Jammu and Kashmir picking up 6/35 in the first innings and 4/59 in the second innings.

Indian Premier League
In April 2018, he was bought by the Kolkata Knight Riders team in the 2018 IPL season as a replacement for injured Kamlesh Nagarkoti. On 6 May 2018, he made his IPL debut against Mumbai Indians replacing injured Shivam Mavi.

In February 2022, he was bought by the Rajasthan Royals for 10 Cr in the Mega auction for the 2022 Indian Premier League tournament.

International career
In March 2021, he was named in India's One Day International (ODI) squad for their series against England. He made his ODI debut for India on 23 March 2021, against England. He went on to take 4 wickets, helping India to win the match by 66 runs.

In May 2021, he was named as one of four standby players in India's Test squad for the final of the 2019–2021 ICC World Test Championship and their away series against England. In September 2021, he was added to India's main squad for the fourth Test match against England but didn't play.

In February 2022, Prasidh was named in India's Squad for ODIs against West Indies. He was named the man of the match in the second match as he took 4 wickets for 12 runs and went on to win the Man of the Series award with a three-fer in the third game.

In May 2022, he was named in India's Test squad for the rescheduled fifth Test against England.

References

External links 

1996 births
Living people
Indian cricketers
India One Day International cricketers
Karnataka cricketers
Kolkata Knight Riders cricketers
Rajasthan Royals cricketers